Katherine Burton is an American actress, the daughter of Welsh actors Richard Burton and Sybil Christopher. On television, Burton received critical acclaim as Ellis Grey in the Shonda Rhimes drama series Grey's Anatomy, and as Vice President Sally Langston on Scandal. She has been nominated for three Primetime Emmy Awards and three Tony Awards.

Early life 
Burton was born in Geneva, Switzerland, the daughter of Welsh parents, producer Sybil Burton (née Williams) and actor Richard Burton. She was thus the stepdaughter of Elizabeth Taylor and of Sybil's second husband Jordan Christopher, both actors. Burton earned a bachelor's degree in Russian Studies and European History from Brown University in 1979, where she was on the board of Production Workshop, one of the university's student theater groups, and a master's degree from Yale School of Drama in 1982. Brown awarded Burton an honorary doctorate in 2007.

Career

Stage work 
Burton's first notable role on Broadway was in a 1982 production of the Noël Coward play Present Laughter directed by George C. Scott. The following year, she appeared in the Broadway musical Doonesbury, playing J.J. Burton also appeared as Alice in Eva Le Gallienne's Alice in Wonderland on Broadway, produced by The Mirror Theater Ltd's Sabra Jones. Several key roles followed, including roles in Wendy Wasserstein's An American Daughter and Martin McDonagh's The Beauty Queen of Leenane.

In 2002, she received Tony Award nominations in separate performance categories: Best Actress in a Play, for her portrayal of the title role in Henrik Ibsen's Hedda Gabler, and Best Featured Actress in a Play for her portrayals of Pinhead/Mrs. Kendal in the revival of The Elephant Man. As of May 2019, she is one of only six actors, including Amanda Plummer, Dana Ivey, Jan Maxwell, Mark Rylance, and Jeremy Pope, to be nominated for Tony awards in two different categories in the same year. In 2006, Burton starred in the Off-Broadway production of The Water's Edge opposite Tony Goldwyn. That year, she again received a Tony nomination for Best Leading Actress in a Play for her role in W. Somerset Maugham's The Constant Wife. In 2007, she played Ranevskaya in The Cherry Orchard at Boston's Huntington Theatre. On December 21, 2007, she joined the cast of the Broadway musical Spring Awakening in the role of the Adult Women when she replaced actress Christine Estabrook. Kristine Nielsen replaced her on March 2, 2008, for a short stint until Estabrook reassumed the role. During the summer of 2010, Burton portrayed actress Katharine Cornell in A.R. Gurney's The Grand Manner at Lincoln Center in New York. In April 2017, she began playing Liz Essendine in the Broadway revival of Present Laughter, the play in which she made her debut.

Film and television 
Burton's first screen appearance was in the 1969 film Anne of the Thousand Days, starring her father, with whom she later appeared as Alice opposite his White Knight in the 1983 Great Performances broadcast of Alice in Wonderland, and in the 1984 CBS miniseries Ellis Island. Other films include Big Trouble in Little China, The First Wives Club, Life with Mikey, and The Ice Storm. Burton has said of these roles that she usually plays "the sweet wife, or the sweet dead wife."

Burton has been perhaps most prolific in her work on television. She made many television appearances in the late 1980s and 1990s on such episodic shows as Spenser: For Hire, All My Children, and Brooklyn Bridge. About playing the mother, in her late thirties, of David Schwimmer's character in the short-lived 1994 FOX sitcom, Monty, she said, "you don't really start playing moms in Hollywood until you're in your 40s, and usually the kids are almost your age! When I played Schwimmer's mother, I was 37 and he was, I think, 28. . . that happens a lot in TV and film; you really do end up being close in age to your child, which is nonsensical." In 1996, Burton won a Daytime Emmy award for her performance as a mother dying of breast cancer in the ABC Afterschool Special, 'Notes for my Daughter'. More recently, she made guest appearances as recurring characters on Law & Order, The Practice, The West Wing, Judging Amy and Medium. She also appeared on the HBO miniseries Empire Falls.

Some of her recurring television roles have involved subplots concerning Alzheimer's disease. On FX network's Rescue Me, she played the role of Rose, a friend and possible romantic interest to Chief Jerry Reilly. Reilly, whose wife is in a facility suffering from Alzheimer's, hires Rose, a caregiver for her husband who was also a victim, to provide assistance and emotional support. Burton's most visible and well-known role to date is the mysterious and difficult mother of Dr. Meredith Grey (Ellen Pompeo), the titular character on ABC's medical drama Grey's Anatomy. Burton plays Dr. Ellis Grey, the former trailblazing surgeon, and a two-time winner of the fictionalized, prestigious Harper Avery Award. Her character's battle and death of Alzheimer's is central to Meredith's story in all seasons of the series, as Meredith fears both getting the disease and resembling her mother as she ages. The character is also revealed to be the birth mother of Meredith's half-sister, Dr. Maggie Pierce (Kelly McCreary) through her love affair with Dr. Richard Webber (James Pickens, Jr.).

Like Schwimmer's character in Monty, Burton and Pompeo (who portrays Meredith) also have a small age gap, with Pompeo being 12 years her junior. In-universe, Meredith (born 1978) is 25 years younger than Ellis (born 1953), with Pompeo aged down 11 years and Burton aged up 4 years. (Though the character's exact ages were not determined until a retcon was established in season 11). In 2008, the New York City Chapter of the Alzheimer's Association singled her out for her compelling performances in both shows. In 2006 and 2007, Burton received Emmy nominations for her Grey's Anatomy role. Burton's character dies in the third season episode "Some Kind of Miracle", which aired in 2007; she returned to the role five years later, in the season 8 alternate reality episode. It depicts a version of her life where Richard did not leave her and she did not have Alzheimer's. Burton's character is central to the eleventh season, as Meredith's marital struggles begin to parallel her own mother's struggles, something she feared. She reprised her role in flashbacks for the eleventh season, showing Ellis briefly before her Alzheimer's diagnosis. In season 14's landmark 300th episode, Burton's Ellis is shown as a dream-sequence figure, clapping for Meredith, who has also now won a Harper Avery award. She re-appears twice as a dream sequence figure in the fifteenth season. Burton will return to the role in the eighteenth season, beginning with its season premiere.

In 2011, Burton appeared as Marie Kessler, a veteran monster hunter, and the aunt of Nick Burkhardt in the opening episodes of the NBC supernatural drama Grimm. Since 2012, she plays the recurring role of Vice President Sally Langston in the ABC hit show Scandal, for which she again received an Emmy nomination. In 2015, it was reported that Burton was cast in a leading role in the U.S. remake of the French-language film Martyrs, which opened theatrically in January 2016. In March 2017, she reprised her role as Aunt Marie Kessler in the series finale of Grimm.

Other work 
Burton has narrated numerous audiobooks, including works by: Patricia Cornwell, Lisa Scottoline, Iris Johansen, and Dean Koontz.

Personal life 
In 1985, Burton married Michael Ritchie, Artistic Director of the Center Theatre Group in Los Angeles and one of the producers of the Broadway musicals The Drowsy Chaperone and Curtains. They met in 1982, while Ritchie was stage manager of a revival of Noël Coward's Present Laughter at the Circle in the Square Theatre in New York City in which Burton was playing the character Daphne. They have two children, a son, Morgan Ivor  and a daughter, Charlotte Frances.

Filmography

Film

Television

References

External links 

 
 
 

20th-century American actresses
21st-century American actresses
American film actresses
American people of Welsh descent
American expatriates in Switzerland
American stage actresses
American television actresses
American voice actresses
Brown University alumni
Daytime Emmy Award winners
Living people
Yale School of Drama alumni
Year of birth missing (living people)